Arp 187 is a radio galaxy and merger remnant located in the constellation Eridanus. It is an interacting galaxy pair (MCG-02-13-040). It is included in the Atlas of Peculiar Galaxies in the category galaxies with narrow filaments.

The galaxy has two prominent radio lobes, however the emission of its AGN in X-ray is low, and so is the thermal output of the AGN torus as observed in infrared, suggesting that it has been quenched. The detection of a narrow line region (with dimensions up to 10 kpc) with still active emission mean that the AGN was still active up to at least 104-5 years ago. In the nucleus of Arp 187 is predicted to lie a supermassive black hole (SMBH) with estimated mass around 6.7 × 108 . Further observations of such a SMBH with a  quenched AGN were published in 2019.

References

External links

 Photo of Arp 187

Radio galaxies
187
16691
Eridanus (constellation)